The 1984 Denver Broncos season was the franchise's 15th season in the National Football League (NFL), and the 25th overall.  The team finished with its then franchise-best record of thirteen wins and three losses and were champions of the AFC West. In the playoffs, the Broncos were upset by the Pittsburgh Steelers in the Divisional Round, 24–17. This would be the final season for Tight End coach Fran Polsfoot, who died in April 1985.

Offseason

NFL Draft

Personnel

Staff

Roster

Regular season

Schedule

Game summaries

Week 7 vs. Packers

Standings

Postseason

AFC Divisional Playoff

Scoring
DEN – Wright 9 pass from Elway (Karlis kick)DEN 7–0
PIT – field goal Anderson 28 DEN 7–3
PIT – Pollard 1 run (Anderson kick) PIT 10–7
DEN – field goal Karlis 21 10–10
DEN – Watson 20 pass from Elway (Karlis kick) DEN 17–10
PIT – Lipps 10 pass from Malone (Anderson kick) 17–17
PIT – Pollard 2 run (Anderson kick) PIT 24–17

The Broncos lost to the Steelers 24–17 at Denver's Mile High Stadium on Sunday, December 30, 1984. The game was televised on NBC.  Given Denver's record and their opportunistic defense, Pittsburgh was the decided underdog.  Indeed, much talk before the game centered on a possible meeting of two up-and-coming quarterbacks—Denver's John Elway and Miami's Dan Marino—in the AFC Championship Game.

The game turned into a defensive struggle.  After the Broncos' first drive ended in a punt, Steelers' quarterback Mark Malone fumbled on two consecutive drives; the first ended in a missed Rich Karlis field goal, but the second was converted into a touchdown pass from Elway to receiver Jim Wright.  The Steelers then answered with a scoring drive, as Gary Anderson kicked a 28-yard field goal.

With the teams trading punts, a miscue by the Steelers threatened to blow the game open.  Midway through the second quarter, Steelers' punter Craig Colquitt had his punt blocked—the first of his career—and Denver set up at Pittsburgh's four-yard-line.  But on third-and-goal, Elway floated a weak pass into the arms of nose tackle Gary Dunn.  Now with the momentum, the Steelers were able to put a drive together at the end of the first half, resulting in a one-yard Frank Pollard touchdown run.  The Broncos tried to tie the game with time running out in the half, but a long field goal attempt by Karlis fell short.

Leading somewhat surprisingly 10–7, Pittsburgh looked to grind out yards on the ground and keep Elway on the sidelines.  But Denver managed two drives to take the lead in the quarter; the first ended with a Karlis chip-shot to tie the game at 10, then Elway hit receiver Steve Watson for a 20-yard strike to take a 17–10 lead.  The Steelers then came back with a drive of their own, resulting in a 10-yard touchdown pass from Malone to receiver Louis Lipps.  After both defenses held and forced a couple of more punts, Pittsburgh used Pollard and Walter Abercrombie to knife through a tiring Broncos defense.  A key pass to Weegie Thompson put the Steelers at the 15-yard-line, where they stalled.  However, Anderson missed his second field goal of the afternoon, and Denver took over with about three minutes left.

Having sustained a groin pull and a twisted knee, however, Elway was not as mobile and was experiencing difficulty with his throws.  On second down, Elway threw a pass over the middle that was intercepted by Steelers' safety Eric Williams, who then ran the ball down to the 2-yard-line.  After a short run and an incomplete pass, Pollard scored the go-ahead touchdown with a 1-yard run.

With a hobbled Elway not being able to lead the team to a first down, the Broncos turned the ball over on downs.  They then used all their time-outs while stopping the Steelers, who, somewhat controversially, attempted a field goal on fourth down—only to see Anderson miss his third attempt of the day.  Elway then threw to Watson near midfield, but by the time Elway fired the ball out of bounds to stop the clock, only one second remained.  A desperation "Hail Mary" pass fell incomplete, and the Steelers won, 24–17.

The Broncos and their fans were bitterly disappointed by the loss, and finished the year 13–4.  After a season-long, high-profile rivalry with their AFC West stablemates Seattle, neither team would end up in the AFC Championship Game.

References

External links
 1984 Denver Broncos at Pro-Football-Reference.com

Denver Broncos
AFC West championship seasons
Denver Broncos seasons
Denver Bronco